Raúl Manolo Gudiño Vega (born 22 April 1996) is a Mexican professional footballer who plays as a goalkeeper for Liga MX club Necaxa.

Club career

Porto
On 29 August 2014, Guadalajara announced that Gudiño would be joining Portuguese club FC Porto on a ten-month loan, with an option to make the move permanent. He made his debut for the B team in November 2014 against Academico Viseu in the Segunda Liga. On 14 February 2015, he would block a penalty against Feirense in the 32nd minute to help Porto B clinch a 1–0 victory.

On 16 June 2015, Porto announced they had signed Gudiño on a permanent deal by triggering the buy option for €1.5 million. On 11 February 2016, Gudiño joined União da Madeira on loan from FC Porto for the remainder of the season.

APOEL (loan)
On 31 August 2017, Gudiño signed with Cypriot side APOEL FC on a season-long loan. On 17 October, during the UEFA Champions League group-stage match against Borussia Dortmund, Gudiño came on as a substitute for Boy Waterman, becoming the first Mexican goalkeeper to play in a Champions League match.

Guadalajara
On 26 May 2018, Gudiño rejoined Guadalajara after his year-long loan spell with APOEL. On 21 July, he made his debut against Tijuana in a 2–1 loss. On 30 September, during his first Súper Clásico against Club América, Gudiño would block Mateus Uribe’s stoppage-time penalty, keeping the score at 1–1. Following the match, manager José Saturnino Cardozo praised his performance, saying: "[Gudiño] is an excellent goalkeeper, he is growing as a goalkeeper, he has an imposing physique... I think [Mateus Uribe] was frightened by his physical appearance in the penalty box."

Atlanta
On 20 June 2022, Gudiño joined Atlanta United as a free agent on a 1-year contract.

International career

Youth
From 2012 to 2013, Gudiño participated with the under-17 side. He participated in the winning side of the 2013 CONCACAF U-17 Championship, where he won the Golden Glove award.

Gudiño was called up to the under-20 team for the 2015 FIFA U-20 World Cup. He was a starter for the first match against Mali but was benched for the following match.

Gudiño won the CONCACAF Youth Goalkeeper of the Year award in 2013 for his performances in the CONCACAF U-17 Championship and the FIFA U-17 World Cup.

Senior
On 2 October 2018, Gudiño was called up by interim manager Ricardo Ferretti for the October friendlies against Costa Rica and Chile. He earned his first cap with the senior national team on 11 October against Costa Rica, coming on as a half-time substitute for Gibrán Lajud, with Mexico winning the match 3–2.

Style of play
At 1.96 meters (6 ft 5 in), Gudiño stands out for his great reflexes, good aerial game, as well as his penalty-blocking ability.

His playing style has led to comparisons to fellow Mexican goalkeeper Guillermo Ochoa.

Career statistics

Club

International

Honours
APOEL
Cypriot First Division: 2017–18

Porto B
LigaPro: 2015–16
Premier League International Cup: 2016–17

Mexico Youth
CONCACAF U-17 Championship: 2013
FIFA U-17 World Cup runner-up: 2013
CONCACAF Olympic Qualifying Championship: 2015

Individual
CONCACAF U-17 Championship Golden Glove: 2013

References

External links 
 

1996 births
Living people
C.D. Guadalajara footballers
FC Porto B players
C.F. União players
APOEL FC players
Atlanta United FC players
Mexico youth international footballers
Mexico under-20 international footballers
Footballers from Guadalajara, Jalisco
Association football goalkeepers
Mexican footballers
Mexican expatriate sportspeople in Cyprus
Expatriate footballers in Cyprus
Mexican expatriate footballers
Cypriot First Division players
Mexico international footballers
Major League Soccer players